Fort Worth University was a college in Fort Worth, Texas that was founded in 1881. It was affiliated with the Methodist Episcopal Church, and was member of the University Senate of the church. The university was dissolved into the Methodist University of Oklahoma in 1911. As described in the latter university's 1915 "Historical Statement":
The Methodist University of Oklahoma is the result of the amalgamation of the Fort Worth University and Epworth University which was brought about in 1911.

Forth Worth University, located at Fort Worth, Texas, was originally Texas Wesleyan College, chartered by the State of Texas June 6, 1881. It was in 1889 that the charter was amended and the name changed to Fort Worth University. This institution under the leadership of wise and faithful men did good service for a number of years. Its graduates are scattered all over the Southwest and are giving a good account of themselves. Only the necessity for combining the educational forces of the Methodist Episcopal Church in the interests of larger endowment and equipment caused old Fort Worth to lose its identity.

The first president was William H. Cannon; later presidents included Oscar L. Fisher and William Fielder. Over the years the university offered A.B., B.S., B.Litt., and Ph.D. degrees. It also offered graduate professional degrees in medicine and law.

In 1897, Fort Worth University's first graduates from its new medical school included Frances Daisy Emery Allen; she was the first female physician to graduate from a Texas medical school. A second prominent graduate was William Duncan MacMillan, class of 1898, who became a faculty member at the University of Chicago and is noted for research on physical cosmology and for advanced textbooks on classical mechanics.

References

Further reading
 This catalogue, which is in the public domain, has been scanned and made available online by the Fort Worth Public Library.

Universities and colleges affiliated with the Methodist Episcopal Church
Protestantism in Texas
Universities and colleges in Fort Worth, Texas
Private universities and colleges in Texas
Educational institutions established in 1881
1881 establishments in Texas